Cemre Baysel is a Turkish actress.

Life and career 
Her maternal family is from Urfa. Her paternal family immigrated from Balkan, Ottoman Empire. She graduated from painting department of Buca Işılay Saygın Fine Arts High School. She is studying in art teacher department of Ege University.

At the age of fifteen, she made her television debut with a supporting role in comedy series Yeşil Deniz. She subsequently appeared in crime İsimsizler in 2017 before being cast in the historical drama series Payitaht: Abdülhamid as Firuze. She rose to prominence through her supporting role in Elimi Bırakma between 2018 and 2019. She then had a role in the crime drama series Ramo. 

In 2020, she was cast in her first leading role in the series Sol Yanım with Burak Bey who co-star of Elini Bırakma. In 2021, she was cast as the lead female in the romantic comedy series Baht Oyunu opposite Aytaç Şaşmaz.  Baysel and Şaşmaz started dating while shooting the series. She starred in the series Senden Daha Güzel, in which she plays the female lead character.

He joined BluTV's detective series "Bozkır".

She was awarded as the Shining Star at the Golden Butterfly Awards in 2021. In 2022, she became the face of Seçil Store, Citroen Turkey, and La Roche Posay.

Filmography

References

External links 
 
 

Living people
Turkish television actresses
1999 births